Sir William de la Pole (1478 – sometime between October and November 1539), was an English nobleman, and Knight of Wingfield Castle in Wingfield, Suffolk. He was the son of John de la Pole, 2nd Duke of Suffolk (1442–1492) and Elizabeth Plantagenet (Elizabeth of York, Duchess of Suffolk) (1444–1504). Through his mother, he was clearly in the line of succession to the English Crown, with ultimately disastrous consequences for himself.

Around 1497, he married Katherine Stourton, daughter of William Stourton, 2nd Baron Stourton and Margaret Chidiocke, but they had no issue. Katherine, twice widowed and aged about 42, was more than 20 years older than William, so the motive for the marriage was probably financial (her second husband, Henry, Lord Grey of Codnor, had left her much of his property).

He was brother to John de la Pole, 1st Earl of Lincoln, Edmund de la Pole, 3rd Duke of Suffolk and Richard de la Pole. As nephews of Edward IV the de la Pole family had a much stronger hereditary claim to the throne than Henry VII, who was descended through his mother from an illegitimate son of John of Gaunt. Even if William, unlike his brothers, had no personal ambition to seize the throne, his ancestry would have made it impossible for Henry to trust him. The discovery of a plot involving the de la Pole brothers in 1501 sealed William's fate.

He was held prisoner in the Tower of London for 37 years till his death, longer than anyone else in the Tower's history, for allegedly plotting against King Henry VII with his brothers Edmund and Richard, who fled the country in 1501, after their conspiracy was detected. The fact that William did not flee with them might have been seen as evidence that he was innocent, but the King was clearly taking no chances about his loyalty.

Ancestors

References

1478 births
1539 deaths
15th-century English people
16th-century English people
William
People from Mid Suffolk District
English knights
Younger sons of dukes